The Funhouse is a 1980 novelization by American  author Dean Koontz, based on a Larry Block (aka Lawrence J. Block) screenplay, which was made into the 1981 film The Funhouse, directed by Tobe Hooper. As the film production took longer than expected, the book was released before the film.

Koontz originally published the novel under the pseudonym Owen West.

Plot synopsis 
In 1955, Ellen, a young woman tired of being oppressed by her meek father and psychotically religious mother, falls in love with a barker from a traveling carnival named Conrad. Despite her mother's pleas, she runs away with the carnival and marries him. However, it quickly  becomes clear that Conrad is using Ellen to spawn the Antichrist, as she later finds out he is a Satan worshiper. Stuck at the fair as she cannot go back to her parents, she eventually gives birth to a hideously deformed infant.

One stormy night, the demonic baby attacks Ellen. She crushes it to death just as Conrad comes home.  Enraged, he beats but does not kill her, stating that he will hunt her down one day and murder her own children.  Ellen runs off into the night.

In 1980, a girl named Amy gets pregnant by her boyfriend. He refuses to raise the child or pay for an abortion. She tearfully runs home to her religious, alcoholic mother who is later revealed to be Ellen. Amy eventually tells her mother that she is pregnant, causing her to strike her. However, she agrees to pay for an abortion and takes her to the doctor, but only to stop Amy from "giving birth to the Antichrist".

Meanwhile, Amy's younger brother, Joey, is secretly afraid of Ellen as she frequently comes into his room late at night, drunkenly ranting about how he may be a demon in disguise. He decides to run away with a traveling fair that is coming to town the following week.

The carnival is revealed to be Conrad's. After years of searching, the other carnies try to persuade the barker that he will never find Ellen, but he refuses to give up. That night, a young couple is lured to the carnival's funhouse where they are disemboweled and partially eaten by Gunther, the demonic, monstrous son that Conrad had with the carnival's fortune teller, Madame Zena. Conrad plans to use Gunther to kill Ellen's children. 

Amy visits the diner where her promiscuous best friend, Liz, works. Liz reveals she is going to run away to Las Vegas and become a call girl. She invites Amy to come with her the morning after they go to the carnival.  Joey visits the fair during the day and is recognized by Conrad as possibly being Ellen's child. When asked what his mother's name is, Joey is frightened and lies. Conrad is disappointed, but lets him go.

After running background checks on the town's residents through a private investigator, Conrad learns that Amy and Joey are Ellen's children. He reveals his plan to lure them the funhouse and kill them to a horrified Madame Zena. When she refuses to help with his scheme, he strangles her to death. That night, Amy, Liz, and their dates, Buzz and Ritchie, descend on the carnival. Joey escapes home and goes to the carnival as well, with the intent of running away with it. He finds Conrad and tells him his desire. The barker lures him to the funhouse and reveals that he knows he lied about his mother before tying him up.

The group arrive at the funhouse and board. Midway through the ride, Conrad shuts off the power, stranding the four teens inside. Richie is dragged away by Gunther through a trap door before having his head torn off. The three others attempt to find an exit. Amy arms herself with a knife from a display. Liz runs further into the funhouse alone before being found by Gunther and dismembered in the basement. Conrad appears and fatally shoots Buzz with a pistol. He has brought Joey with him, keeping him at the end of a rope leash. Amy manages to keep the knife hidden. She tricks Conrad into thinking she is approaching Joey to comfort him, before stabbing him in the throat and taking his gun.

Amy and Joey find the basement and travel down, where Gunther attacks. After Amy shoots him, he falls into the funhouse's machinery and is torn apart. They find the exit and Amy carries Joey out of the funhouse and into the morning light.

Characters 
 Ellen Harper - mother of Amy and Joey and ex-wife to Conrad
 Conrad Straker - owner and barker of the carnival funhouse, father of Gunther and Victor, ex-husband to Ellen and Madame Zena
 Amy Harper - Ellen's daughter
 Joey Harper - Amy's younger brother
 Jerry Galloway - Amy's ex-boyfriend, father of Amy's aborted child
 Ghost - carnival employee
 Gunther - carnival employee and Conrad's second son
 Paul Harper - Ellen's husband
 Madame Zena - carnival fortune teller, ex-wife to Conrad, mother of Gunther
 Liz - friend of Amy
 Buzz - Amy's date to the carnival
 Richie - Liz's boyfriend
 Marco the Magnificent - carnival magician
 Victor - Conrad and Ellen's baby

References

External links 
 
 The Funhouse Book Review

American thriller novels
1980 American novels
Novels by Dean Koontz
Works published under a pseudonym
Novels based on films
Jove Books books
Novels about rape
Circus books